The 2016 Netball Superleague Grand Final featured Surrey Storm and Manchester Thunder. Having previously played each other in 2012 and 2014, this was the third grand final featuring both teams. Thunder had won both the previous encounters. This was also Surrey Storm's third consecutive grand final, having lost to Thunder in 2014, they defeated Hertfordshire Mavericks in 2015.

In the 2016 grand final Surrey Storm retained the Netball Superleague title after defeating Manchester Thunder by 55–53. Storm had comfortably led Thunder throughout the first three quarters. They headed into the third quarter with a 32–19 advantage. However in the final quarter Thunder staged a comeback. Thunder's Helen Housby reduced the deficit to just one goal with seconds remaining. However Rachel Dunn secured the title for Storm with the final goal of the game.

Route to the Final

Match summary

Teams

References

2016 Netball Superleague season
2016
Surrey Storm matches
Manchester Thunder matches
Netball Superleague
2016 sports events in London